List of lakes in Russia in alphabetical order:

Arakhley (Арахле́й)
Baikal (Байкал)
Baunt (Баунт)
Beloye, Ryazan Oblast (Белое)
Beloye, Vologda Oblast (Белое)
Bokon (Бокон)
Bolshoye Morskoye (Большое Морское)
Bolshoye Toko (Большое Токо)
Bolshoy Yeravna (Большо́е Ера́вное)
Bolshoye Topolnoye (Большое Топольное)
Botkul (Боткуль)
Brosno (Бросно)
Busani (Бусани)
Bustakh (Бустах)
Caspian Sea (Каспийское море)
Chany (Чаны)
Chukchagir (Чукчагирское)
Chyortovo (Чёртово)
Dorong (Доронг)
Lake Dynda (Дында)
Ebeyty (Эбейты)
Ekityki (Экитыки)
Elgygytgyn (Эльгыгы́тгын)
Emanda (Эмандьа)
Evoron (Эвopон)
Eyik (Эйик)
Ilirney (Илирней)
Ilmen (Ильмень)
Imandra (Имандра)
Ioni (Иони)
Isinga (Исинга)
Ivan-Arakhley Lake System (Ивано-Арахлейские озёра)
Jack London (Озеро Джека Лондона)
Kapylyushi (Капылюши)
Kenon (Кенон)
Keta (Кета)
Kezanoi (Кезеной-Ам)
Khanka (Ханка)
Khantayskoye (Хантайское)
Khummi (Хумми)
Kizi (Кизи)
Koolen (Коолень)
Krasnoye, Leningrad Oblast (Красное)
Krasnoye, Chukotka (Красное)
Kronotskoye (Кроноцкое)
Kubenskoye (Кубенское)
Kuchuk (Кучукское)
Kulunda (Кулундинское)
Labaz (Лабаз)
Ladoga (Ладожское)
Lama (Лама)
Lovozero (Ловозеро)
Maly Yeravna (Малое Еравное)
Nedzheli (Ниди́ли)
Neito (Нейто)
Nero (Неро)
Nerpichye (Нерпичье)
Nichatka (Ничатка)
Numto (Нумто)
Omuk-Kyuyol (Омук-Кюёль)
Onega (Онежское)
Orel (Орель)
Oron (Орон)
Orotko (Оротко)
Ozhogino (Ожогино)
Pleshcheyevo (Плещеево)
Peipus (Чудско-Псковское)
Pekulney (Пекульнейское озеро)
Pyakuto (Пякуто)
Pyasino (Пясино)
Segozero (Сегозеро)
Seliger (Селигер)
Shalkar-Yega-Kara (Шалкар-Ега-Кара)
Soluntakh (Солунтах)
Suturuokha (Сутуруоха)
Svetloyar (Светлояр)
Syamozero (Сямозеро)
Tabanda (Табанда)
Taimyr (Таймыр)
Tandovo (Тандово)
Telemba (Телемба)
Teletskoye (Телецкое)
Tenis (Тенис)
Topozero (Топозеро)
Tytyl (Тытыль)
Ubinskoye (Убинское)
Ulakhan-Kyuel (Улахан кюэль)
Uvs Nuur
Valdayskoye (Валдайское)
Vistytis (Виштынецкое озеро)
Vivi (Ви́ви)
Yeravna-Khorga Lake System (Еравно-Хоргинской системы озёр)
Yessey (Ессей)
Zyuratkul (Зюраткуль)

External links

References 

 
Russia
Lakes